Nana Adwoa Awindor is a Ghanaian television host and the Development Queenmother of Afigya-Kwabre district in the  Ashanti Region of Ghana.  In 2013, she was elected  the First President of the Continental Executive Board of the African Queens and Women Cultural Leaders Network. She is a member of the Ghana National Union of Queenmothers (Women Traditional Leaders).

Career
NanaHemaa Awindor is the host of First Ghanaian International Link television show Greetings From Abroad/Back Home Again, and the CEO of a production company, Premier Productions.

Personal life
Awindor is a native of Adum Kwanwoma. She is the mother of singer Efya.
Award 
Awindor was named CIMG Marketing Woman of the Year (2006).

References

Year of birth missing (living people)
Living people
Ghanaian television presenters
Ghanaian women television presenters